Swift Current is a city in Saskatchewan, Canada.

Swift Current may also refer to:

Places 
 Swift Current, Newfoundland and Labrador
 Swift Current No. 137, Saskatchewan, a rural municipality
 Swift Current (provincial electoral district), a provincial electoral district
 Swift Current, a Mennonite colony in Mexico, see Mennonites in Mexico
 Swift Current, a Mennonite colony in Bolivia, see Mennonites in Bolivia

Other uses 
 , a Royal Canadian Navy minesweeper